January 4 - Eastern Orthodox liturgical calendar - January 6

All fixed commemorations below are observed on January 18 by Orthodox Churches on the Old Calendar.

For January 5th, Orthodox Churches on the Old Calendar commemorate the Saints listed on December 23.

Feasts
 Eve of the Theophany of Our Lord and Saviour Jesus Christ.

Saints
 Prophet Micah (9th century BC)  (see also: August 14)
 Martyr Theopemptus, Bishop of Nicomedia and Martyr Theonas, former sorcerer (303)
 Martyr Sais.
 Martyr Theoidus.
 Saint Syncletica of Alexandria, nun (c. 350 or c. 460))
 Venerable Domnina (Domna).
 Venerable Tatiana, nun.
 Saint Apollinaris, Virgin, of Egypt (c. 470)  (see also: January 4)
 Venerable Phosterius the Hermit (6th century)
 Saint Menas of Sinai (6th century)
 Venerable Gregory of Crete, monk (c. 820) 
 Venerable Dorotheos the Younger, restorer of the ancient Monastery of the Holy Trinity at Chiliokomon in Amaseia, Pontus.

Pre-Schism Western saints
 Hieromartyr Saint Telesphorus, a Greek who was Pope of Rome for ten years (c. 136) (see also February 22, Eastern Orthodox)
 Saint Emiliana, a Roman lady and the paternal aunt of Pope St Gregory the Great (6th century)
 Saint Kiara (Chier), a spiritual daughter of St Fintan Munnu; she lived in Ireland near Nenagh in Co. Tipperary, at a place now called Kilkeary after her (c. 680)
 Venerable Cera of Ireland (Ciar, Cyra, Cior, Ceara), Abbess (7th century) 
 Venerable Conwoïon (Convoyon), a Breton saint and Abbot (868)
 Saint Gaudentius of Gnesen (Radim Gaudentius), first Archbishop of Gnesen in Poland (1004)

Post-Schism Orthodox saints
 New Monk-martyr Romanus of Carpenision and Kapsokalyvia, at Constantinople (1694) (see also February 16)
 Venerable Symeon of the Pskov-Caves Monastery, Hiero-Schemamonk (1960)
 Venerable Theophan, Schema-Archimandrite of the Rykhlovsk Monastery (ru), Ukraine (1977)

New martyrs and confessors
 New Hieromartyr Archpriest Andrei Zimin (1920)
 New Hieromartyr Joseph Bespalov, and with him 37 Martyrs (1921)
 Hieromartyr Stephen Ponomarev, Protopresbyter, at Alma-Ata (1933)
 Virgin-martyr Eugenia Domozhirova, at Alma-Ata (1933)
 New Hieromartyr Sergius Lavrov, Priest (1934)
 Martyr Matthew Gusev (1938)

Other commemorations
 Translation of the relics of St. Rumon of Tavistock, Bishop, to Tavistock Abbey.
 Repose of Monk Alexander of Valaam Monastery (1810)

Icon gallery

Notes

References

Sources
 January 5/January 18. Orthodox Calendar (PRAVOSLAVIE.RU).
 January 18 / January 5. HOLY TRINITY RUSSIAN ORTHODOX CHURCH (A parish of the Patriarchate of Moscow).
 January 5. OCA - The Lives of the Saints.
 The Autonomous Orthodox Metropolia of Western Europe and the Americas (ROCOR). St. Hilarion Calendar of Saints for the year of our Lord 2004. St. Hilarion Press (Austin, TX). p. 5.
 January 5. Latin Saints of the Orthodox Patriarchate of Rome.
 The Roman Martyrology. Transl. by the Archbishop of Baltimore. Last Edition, According to the Copy Printed at Rome in 1914. Revised Edition, with the Imprimatur of His Eminence Cardinal Gibbons. Baltimore: John Murphy Company, 1916. p. 6.
Greek Sources
 Great Synaxaristes:  5 ΙΑΝΟΥΑΡΙΟΥ. ΜΕΓΑΣ ΣΥΝΑΞΑΡΙΣΤΗΣ.
  Συναξαριστής. 5 Ιανουαρίου. ECCLESIA.GR. (H ΕΚΚΛΗΣΙΑ ΤΗΣ ΕΛΛΑΔΟΣ). 
Russian Sources
  18 января (5 января). Православная Энциклопедия под редакцией Патриарха Московского и всея Руси Кирилла (электронная версия). (Orthodox Encyclopedia - Pravenc.ru).
  5 января (ст.ст.) 18 января 2013 (нов. ст.) . Русская Православная Церковь Отдел внешних церковных связей. (DECR).

January in the Eastern Orthodox calendar